Monte-Carlo Automobiles S.A.R.L. is a car manufacturer based in Monte Carlo, Monaco. The company specializes in manufacturing handmade sports cars. The company was founded in 1983 by engineer Fulvio Maria Ballabio, a former Formula Two, IndyCar Series and Offshore racer.

Montecarlo Automobiles began manufacturing its first street-legal GT car in 1989, which was made entirely of carbon fiber and powered by a Lamborghini engine, named Centenaire. That same year, the company also produced a street-legal Spider convertible named Beau Rivage. , their team (which includes former Lamborghini engineers and other Italian car designers, have produced nearly 60 cars and prototypes. MCA has built cars for both racing and cruising. The majority of cars were manufactured using Italian components by experienced Italian Lamborghini mechanics.

The local Monte Carlo Motor Museum displays a large collection of rare foreign exhibits featuring luxury models and other well-known sports cars. All the previously made MCA models can be viewed including racing cars built in the early 1980s.

The MCA Centenaire V12 won its class in the 1993 6 Hours of Vallelunga.

Montecarlo Automobiles was acquired in 1995 by the French Aixam Mega group, who built and sold a model of sports car derived from the original MCA Centenaire, named the MEGA Monte Carlo V12, which came with a Mercedes V12 unleaded petrol engine. Although several prototypes were made, their promised production run never started. Aixam returned company ownership to its Italian founders.

Montecarlo Automobiles started a collaboration with FIA, ACI and Commissione Sportiva Automobilistica Italiana in 2005 to produce the Carlo Chiti Strawdale 90 which was powered by non-petrol sources. Its design was derived from two cars: the street-legal ALA 50 powered by methane and liquefied petroleum gas, and the Quadrifuel Carlo Chiti powered by an engine derived from the Alfa Romeo 8C coupe combined with an electric motor fitted to the front axle using methane, ethanol, liquefied petroleum gas and gasoline. The Carlo Chiti Strawdale 90 finished in the top three of the Methane class of the FIA Alternative Energies Cup.

On 25 March 2012, Montecarlo Automobiles released a new car named Monte Carlo/BRC W12 in collaboration with BRC. It competed in the 4 Hours of Monza with other gasoline-powered cars such as the Ferrari 458, Lamborghini Gallardo, Porsche 911 and the Chevrolet Corvette, finishing in eighth place.

In 2014, the company unveiled a sports car called the Montecarlo Automobiles Rascasse equipped with a mid-mounted, BMW-sourced 5.4-liter V-12 engine with a total output of over 500 horsepower.

References

 Vehicle manufacturing companies established in 1983
 Car manufacturers of Monaco